The 8.8 cm KwK 36 was an  tank gun used by the German Army during World War II. This was the primary armament of the PzKpfw VI Tiger I tank. It was developed and built by Krupp.

Design
The KwK 36 was derived from the 8.8 cm FlaK 36 anti-aircraft gun by adapting/modifying it to the limited space available in tank turrets. The breech block was of vertical falling wedge type and operated semi-automatically, meaning that after firing the empty cartridge case was automatically ejected, while the breech cocked itself and remained open, ready to receive the next round.

The "L/56" in the designation is descriptor of barrel length; the ratio of the length of the barrel in proportion to the width of the bore. The longer the tube is in relation to its bore, the higher the muzzle velocity it can generate on fixed charge. A longer gun barrel allows the expanding gas from the shell's charge to act on the projectile longer than a short barrel, imparting it more velocity and force. For the Tiger II's 8.8 cm KwK 43 L/71, barrel length is  generating a higher velocity.

Performance

The KwK 36 was very accurate and high-powered, and its high muzzle velocity produced a very flat trajectory. This allowed its gunners a higher margin of error in estimating range.

The sighting system resulted in excellent firing accuracy for the 8.8 cm KwK 36 gun on the Tiger I.

Capability
The gun's performance was highly dependent on distance to target and type of ammunition loaded. For kinetic penetration, the speed of the projectile upon impact is crucial, and the cumulative effect of air resistance decreases the velocity of the shell as the distance to the target increases. The accuracy achieved during controlled test firing to determine the pattern of dispersion gives a greater accuracy than the variation expected during practice firing on a range due to differences between guns, ammunition and gunners; both at precisely known distances.
Due to errors in estimating the range and many other factors, the probability of a first shot hit under battlefield conditions was much lower than at the firing range. Observing the tracer from the first round in battle, the average, calm gunner might achieve the firing range accuracy shown in the second column with the second round fired at the same target.

This gun used the same size 88 x 571R mm cartridge, with the exception of being electrically primed compared to the percussion primed cases employed by the Flak 18/36/37.

Panzergranate 39 (PzGr. 39)

 Type: Armour-piercing, capped, ballistic cap (APCBC) projectile with explosive filler and tracer.
 Projectile weight: 
 Muzzle velocity:  
 Explosive filler: 
 Propellant weight:

PzGr. 40 (APCR)
 Type: Armour-piercing, composite rigid (APCR) projectile had a sub-calibre tungsten carbide core. 
 Projectile weight: 
 Muzzle velocity:  
 Propellant weight:

Hl.39 (HEAT)
 Type: high explosive anti-tank (HEAT) round with a shaped charge.
 Projectile weight:  
 Muzzle velocity:

Sprgr. L/45 (HE)
 Type: high explosive (HE) round
 Projectile weight: 
 Explosive filler: 0.9 kg of amatol (3765 Kilojoules)
 Propellant weight: –

Penetration comparison

See also
 8.8 cm KwK 43 L/71 - the direct successor to this gun, and the one mounted on the Tiger II
 8.8 cm Flak 18/36/37/41, the prominent anti-aircraft and anti-tank weapon the 8.8 cm KwK 36 is often confused with.

Weapons of comparable role, performance, and era
 British Ordnance QF 17-pounder 
 Soviet 85 mm D-5T/ZiS-S-53
 United States 90 mm Gun M3

References

Bibliography
 Green Michael, Panzers at War. London: Zenith Press, 2005. 
 Thomas L. Jentz, Germany's Tiger Tanks: Tiger I and Tiger II - Combat Tactics. London: Schiffer Publishing, 1996. 
 H.Dv. 481/60 Merkblatt für die Munition der 8,8 cm Kampfwagenkanone 36

External links

Information about the Tiger I and its KwK 36 gun at the Tiger I Information Center
Historical and technical data on the 88 mm FlaK 36 and KwK 36, as well as on the PzKpfw VI Tiger I at the Armorsite

Tank guns of Germany
World War II artillery of Germany
World War II tank guns
88 mm artillery
Tank guns
Military equipment introduced from 1940 to 1944